Paul Sloane (April 19, 1893  November 15, 1963) was an American screenwriter and film director who directed 26 films from 1925 to 1952, and wrote or co-wrote 35 films.  His movies include Hearts in Dixie (1929) with Stepin Fetchit, The Woman Accused (1933) with Cary Grant, The Texans (1938) with Joan Bennett, Randolph Scott and Walter Brennan, and "Geronimo" (1939) with Preston Foster, Ellen Drew, Andy Devine, and Chief Thundercloud.

Partial filmography

 The Cossack Whip (1916)
 The Lady of the Photograph (1917)
 The Dead Line (1920)
 Beyond Price (1921)
A Stage Romance (1922)
The Town That Forgot God (1922)
Who Are My Parents? (1922)
If Winter Comes (1923)
Homeward Bound (1923)
Too Many Kisses (1925)
The Shock Punch (1925)
Made for Love (1926)
Eve's Leaves (1926)
Corporal Kate (1926)
The Blue Danube (1928)
Hearts in Dixie (1929)
The Cuckoos (1930)
Half Shot at Sunrise (1930)
War Correspondent (1932)
The Woman Accused (1933)
Lone Cowboy (1933)
Straight Is the Way (1934)
The Texans (1938)
Geronimo (1939)

External links

1893 births
1963 deaths
American film directors